Scythris bazaensis is a moth of the family Scythrididae. It was described by Bengt Å. Bengtsson in 1997. It is found in southern Spain.

Etymology
The species name refers to Baza (Spain, Granada province), the type location.

References

bazaensis
Moths described in 1997